Winthrop Smillie Boggs (December 20, 1902 – May 30, 1974) was a philatelist renowned for his expertise and philatelic writing.

Philatelic accomplishments
Boggs wrote a number of the definitive books in philately:

 The Foundations of Philately (1955)
 Ten Decades Ago: 1840-1850, a Study of the Work of Rawdon, Wright, Hatch and Edson of New York City (1949)
 The Postage Stamps and Postal History of Newfoundland (1942)
 The Postage Stamps and Postal History of Canada (1945)

Philatelic leadership
Boggs was a member of the Collectors Club of New York and served the club in a number of capacities. He was the first executive director at the Philatelic Foundation during the period 1945-1961.

Honors
 The Crawford Medal (1947)
 Luff Award for Distinguished Philatelic Research (1952)
 The Lichtenstein Medal (1958)
 Signed the Roll of Distinguished Philatelists (1959)
 Elected to the American Philatelic Society Hall of Fame (1974)

External links
 Profile at the American Philatelic Society Hall of Fame.
 Canada Library and Archives Philatelic Bibliography

1902 births
1974 deaths
American philatelists
Writers from New York City
Philately of Canada
Philatelic authors
American Philatelic Society